The Bishop of Ross was a separate episcopal title which took its name after the town of Rosscarbery in County Cork, Ireland. The title is now united with other bishoprics. In the Church of Ireland it is held by the Bishop of Cork, Cloyne and Ross, and in the Roman Catholic Church it is held by the Bishop of Cork and Ross.

Pre-Reformation bishops

Bishops during the Reformation

Post-Reformation bishops

Church of Ireland succession

Roman Catholic succession

Notes

References

 
 

Bishops of Cork or Cloyne or of Ross
Ross